The 1856 Illinois gubernatorial election was the eleventh election for this office.  Democratic governor Joel Aldrich Matteson did not seek re-election. Former Democratic Congressman William Henry Bissell was nominated by the newly formed Republican Party at the Bloomington Convention. Former Whig Mayor of Chicago Buckner S. Morris was nominated on the Know-Nothing Party ticket. This was the first election of a Republican governor in Illinois history.
At this time in Illinois history the Lieutenant Governor was elected on a separate ballot from the governor. This would remain the case until the adoption of the 1970 constitution.

Results

References
Illinois Blue Book 1899
 The Political Graveyard

Illinois
1856
Gubernatorial
November 1856 events